John Isaac Heard (1787 – 1 September 1862) was an Irish Whig politician. He sat in the House of Commons of the United Kingdom from 1852 to 1859.

Born in Kinsale, County Cork, Heard was the son of John Heard and Rachel, daughter of Isaac Servatt. He was admitted to Peterhouse, Cambridge in 1804, graduating with a Bachelor of Arts in 1808. He married Mary Wilkes, daughter of Hope Wilkes, in 1808, and they had six children: Joh Wilkes Heard (1811–1825); Robert Heard (born 1815); Martha Ann Heard (1809–1834); Catherine Jane Heard (born 1810); Mary Heard (born 1812); and, Eleanor (1814–1840).

He later became a Justice for the Peace and Deputy Lieutenant and, in 1839, High Sheriff of County Cork.

He was elected Whig Member of Parliament (MP) for Kinsale at a by-election in 1852—caused by the resignation of Benjamin Hawes—and held the seat until 1859, when he did not seek re-election.

References

External links
 

Whig (British political party) MPs for Irish constituencies
1787 births
1862 deaths
UK MPs 1847–1852
UK MPs 1852–1857
UK MPs 1857–1859
Deputy Lieutenants in Ireland
Irish justices of the peace
High Sheriffs of County Cork
Alumni of Peterhouse, Cambridge
People from Kinsale
Members of the Parliament of the United Kingdom for County Cork constituencies (1801–1922)